Several ships of the French Navy have borne the name Mars, after Mars, the Roman god of war:

Mars (1705), broken up in 1721.
She was wrecked in 1755 near Halifax, Nova Scotia.
Mars (1762), wrecked in 1765.
Mars (1770), burnt in 1773.
Mars (1860), laid down in 1835 as Sceptre, renamed Masséna in 1840, redesigned as a screw steamer in 1856, launched and completed in 1860. Stricken in 1881 and used as an accommodation  hulk at Toulon, renamed Mars in 1892. Broken up for scrap in 1906.

Privateers
Several French privateers also bore the name.
She was wrecked in 1803, upon Caracole reef off Cap François.

See also
 Mars (disambiguation)

French Navy ship names